Cyclones Gulab and Shaheen were two related, consecutive tropical cyclones that caused considerable damage to South and West Asia. Gulab impacted eastern India, while Shaheen impacted Pakistan, Iran, Oman and the United Arab Emirates. Gulab was the third named storm of the 2021 North Indian Ocean cyclone season, as well as the fourth named storm of the season after its reformation in the Arabian Sea as Shaheen. The cyclone's origins can be traced back to a low-pressure area situated over the Bay of Bengal on September 24. The system quickly organized, with the India Meteorological Department (IMD) upgrading the system to a depression on the same day. On the next day, the system strengthened into a Cyclonic Storm, and the IMD assigned it the name Gulab. On September 26, Gulab made landfall in India's Andhra Pradesh but weakened overland, before degenerating into a remnant low on September 28. The system continued moving westward, emerging into the Arabian Sea on September 29, before regenerating into a depression early on September 30. Early on October 1, the system restrengthened into a Cyclonic Storm, which the IMD named Shaheen. The system gradually strengthened as it entered the Gulf of Oman. While slowly moving westward, the storm turned southwestward, subsequently making an extremely rare landfall in Oman on October 3, as a Category 1-equivalent cyclone. Shaheen then rapidly weakened, before dissipating the next day.

The name Gulab, suggested by Pakistan, means rose in Hindustani. The name Shaheen, provided by Qatar, means falcon in Arabic. The system overall brought heavy rain and strong winds throughout India and the Middle East, killing at least 39 people. Water-related damage was extensive, while communications were disrupted as winds downed many power lines. Hundreds of roads were closed in India. Shaheen delivered extreme rainfall to Oman, causing flooding across a wide area of the country's northeastern governorates. Muscat saw particularly heavy flooding which submerged cars and other low-lying objects. Other neighboring countries in the Arab world also experienced some rain.

Meteorological history

Gulab 
The IMD noted the system as a low-pressure area at 03:00 UTC (08:30 IST); the system formed from a cyclonic circulation which persisted over the Gulf of Martaban. It was later upgraded to a well-marked low-pressure area at 11:00 UTC (16:30 IST), as it developed a cyclonic vortex at 06:00 UTC (11:30 IST). At 15:00 UTC (20:30 IST), the IMD upgraded it to a Depression, as the convection had further organized and the storm's convection, or thunderstorms, were moving in a curved manner. Favorable conditions, such as moderate to high sea-surface temperatures, the Madden–Julian oscillation being favorable for tropical cyclone development, and low vertical wind shear, allowed intensification. By 03:00 UTC the next day, the system was upgraded to a Deep Depression, as its convection further organized near the center. There was also the presence of warm moist air over the center of the system, which was conducive for strengthening. At 15:00 UTC (20:30 IST), the IMD upgraded it to a Cyclonic Storm, as its convection had become better-organized, with a defined central dense overcast, naming the system named Gulab. As it continued westward, the outer rainbands of Cyclone Gulab reached the coastal regions of northern Andhra Pradesh and southern Odisha, which indicated that it had started making landfall, at about 18:00 IST (12:30 UTC) on September 26. At 21:00 UTC (02:30 IST), the JTWC issued its final warning prior to landfall. Three hours later, the IMD downgraded it to a deep depression, as it had lost its energy after travelling over rough Indian terrain. It further weakened into a depression by 20:00 IST (14:30 UTC), as it entered the state of Telangana. It maintained its intensity as it travelled westward, until at 14:00 IST (08:30 UTC), when it weakened into a well-marked low-pressure area over west Vidarbha.

Shaheen 
As Cyclone Gulab weakened into a well-marked low-pressure area over western Vidarbha and its surrounding areas, the India Meteorological Department noted that its remnants may cross the Arabian Sea and regenerate into a tropical cyclone. On September 29 at 17:30 UTC (23:00 IST), the system crossed the Arabian Sea, before the United States Joint Typhoon Warning Center (JTWC) issued a Tropical Cyclone Formation Alert (TCFA) on the disturbance at 17:30 UTC (23:00 IST). At this time, the agency analyzed the system's environmental path as being conducive for tropical cyclogenesis, with warm  sea surface temperatures, enhanced outflow from an upper-level anticyclone and low wind shear. On the next day at 00:00 UTC (05:30 IST), while over the Gulf of Khambat, the IMD upgraded the system to a depression, with the agency designating the system as ARB 02. INSAT 3D satellite imagery at that time showed that the convection had increased near the storm's center.

At 21:00 UTC (03:00 IST, October 1) on that day, the IMD reported that the system had further strengthened to a Cyclonic Storm, with the agency giving it the name Shaheen. The storm's spiral bands were seen wrapping along its obscured low-level circulation center (LLCC), while its Dvorak rating stood at T2.5 at that time. At 15:00 UTC (20:30 IST), the IMD further upgraded it to a severe cyclonic storm, as the clouds had become well-organized moving with a defined curved pattern. At 03:00 UTC (08:30 IST) the next day, the JTWC upgraded it to a Category 1 equivalent tropical cyclone, as it developed an eye; however, the system struggled to develop further, due to inadequate convection. By 06:00 UTC (11:30 IST), the cyclone developed a defined, but ragged eye. At 09:00 UTC (14:30 IST), the JTWC downgraded the cyclone to a tropical storm, but six hours later, the JTWC re-upgraded the system to a Category 1 tropical cyclone. Between 19:00 UTC and 20:00 UTC (00:30 IST and 01:30 IST) on October 3, Shaheen made landfall over the northern Oman coast, making it possibly the only cyclone to make landfall there since 1890. At 21:00 UTC (02:30 IST), the JTWC issued its final warning for the storm, as it made landfall. After making landfall, Shaheen underwent rapid weakening, due to the dry landmass of the Arabian Desert. At 00:00 UTC (05:30 IST), Shaheen weakened to a cyclonic storm and three hours later it further weakened into a deep depression. Satellite imagery showed that the cloud mass had become disorganized. Shaheen rapidly weakened after landfall as it moved further inland, weakening into a depression on October 4, before degenerating into a well-marked low later that day.

Preparations

Gulab

Odisha 
Due to Gulab, the National Disaster Response Force (NDRF) and State Disaster Response Force (SDRF) of Odisha were put on alert and the IMD put the state into high alert. As of September 26, over 30,000 individuals evacuated into safety as a result of the cyclone; this number further increased to 46,075 people as the storm further moved inland. Trains running through the area and neighbor Andhra Pradesh were also canceled.

Shaheen

Pakistan 
Due to the brewing storm, which would become Shaheen, the Pakistan Meteorological Department (PMD) issued a tropical cyclone warning for the country on September 30, with the agency predicting heavy rains and strong winds in the Sindh-Makran coastal areas. The agency also noted that sea conditions were risky for fishermen, advising them to avoid fishing activities until further notice. The education department of Sindh also canceled classes and activities in private and government institutions until October 1. Karachi Commissioner Naveed Ahmad Shaikh recommended that all deputy commissioners should remove all dangerous panels and hoards on buildings and roofings from their respective districts as a precaution. He also warned people of the city to avoid venturing outside and on beaches due to the storm. There is also a ban that the commissioner imposed about going on to beaches that will last until October 5. Karachi also announced a holiday on October 1, as a result of the brewing cyclone.

Oman 
Flights and traffic were delayed and rescheduled to and from the capital city, Muscat. Traffic was also halted between North and South Batina governorates as a result of Shaheen. 55 emergency shelters in Muscat were also prepared for the evacuees and authorities declared October 3–4 to be a work holiday due to the storm. The National Committee for Emergency Management (NCEM) also warned individuals within Shaheen's track to evacuate immediately; as of October 3, 2,734 persons were now in government and other safety shelters to ride out the storm. 40-60 knot-winds and 200 to 500mm rainfall were also forecasted to impact the country. Its medical response were also heightened as the storm approached. A Cricket match between Oman and Scotland had to be abandoned due to Shaheen's potential impacts.

United Arab Emirates 
The Dubai Municipality announced temporary closure of Hatta Parks and other community facilities, while schools in the area shifted to distance learning. A dust storm alert was also issued due to Shaheen on October 4. Warning messages were broadcast in 19 languages, a strategy that involved more than 100 local and national entities. In Al Ain, residents were warned that they may have to briefly work from home, and have schools switch to distance learning temporarily. A large social media effort attempted to reach warnings and information about Shaheen as possible.

Saudi Arabia 
Saudi Arabia was expecting to see torrential rainfall and thunderstorms from Shaheen, after it made landfall on Oman.

Impacts

Gulab
At least 20 total deaths have been attributed to Gulab, as well as ₹20 billion (US$269 million) in damages.

Odisha 
Trees were uprooted and some houses were damaged. A landslide occurred on National Highway 26 near Ralegada, Koraput, causing traffic and disruptions; however, the district's administration quickly restored the road. An overnight downpour flooded a portion of National Highway 26 near a government hospital, but a team from the Odisha Disaster Rapid Action Force (ODRAF) rescued the people inside. No fatalities were reported.

Andhra Pradesh 
Gulab also caused severe damages in the districts of Srikakulam and Vizianagaram in Andhra Pradesh. It caused disruption of communication and electricity due to traffic jams and trees downed. Vizianagaram was flooded with waterlogging due to a bad subterranean drainage system, with hundreds of trees and signs falling elsewhere. Heavy precipitation in Vizag led to regional floods and rainwater winds that led to various trees and saplings being uprooted. The Visakhapatnam Airport was also flooded by heavy rainfall. About  of crop was destroyed by Gulab, resulting in Rs1 billion (US$13.6 million) of damage.

Telangana 
An individual with a bullock cart drowned in Munneru stream on Kothagudem on September 29, following heavy rains.

Shaheen
At least 14 deaths have been attributed to Shaheen.

Gujarat 

Underpasses and roadways were also inundated in the area. As a result, 20 teams of National Disaster Response Force (NDRF's) were deployed in the whole state for possible continuous rains. 194 tehsils also reported torrential rainfall, with Palsana in Surat collecting  of downpour. Over 100 water reservoirs were put under alert as a result. Street flooding and rivers increasing their capacities due to dams releasing water. Yellow alerts were placed in 20 districts while 6 places were under orange alert as of September 29. The Indian Coast Guard also warned fishermen not to venture in the seas affected by the storm in at least three days.

Continued rains in the state forced the closure of 140 state roads, 207 roads in 20 districts and 14 state highways. Tithal Beach in Valsad were also closed. Nine more small irrigation dams overflowed in Kutch district as a result of three-day rains in the area while boats in the Arabian Sea were asked to return to ports for safety; 363 of them obeyed it while 474 remained in sea and were expected to return to ports by October 4.

Pakistan 
The cyclone caused light downpours and gusty winds in parts of Karachi on September 30. The city's Millennium Mall on Rashid Minhas Road also saw heavy traffic due to three electric poles falling on the area. The traffic police removed them immediately as a result. Another pole impacted a car in the parking lot of Frere Hall. On the fishing village in Ibrahim Hyderi, five fishermen were rescued as their fishing boat capsized in the manner of high seas as a result of the system. Gulshan-e-Hadeed recorded the highest rainfall from the system at  while the first fatality from the system were recorded when an individual was electrocuted, as reported by the rescue officials in Orangi Subdivision. Several roadways were also inundated with floodwaters in Karachi.

Iran 
Cyclone Shaheen brought heavy rainfall to Iran, six people were also killed in the Chabahar Port. There was also damage to electrical facilities and roads. Five fishermen were missing after two fishing vessels sank off the coast of Sistan and Baluchestan Province, local medias in the country reported. 13 injuries were also injured due to several wind damages. In Sistan and Baluchestan Province, over 122 people were hospitalized due to a dust storm brought by the cyclone. Eye, heart, and lung problems were among those in the hospital.

Oman 
Maximum wind speed reached , and the tallest waves stretched .
A child who had gone missing during the flooding was found dead in Wilayah of Al Amarat. Another person, also in Muscat, is reported missing. A building also collapsed in Suwaiq on October 4, with unknown workers inside; no fatalities were recorded. Many houses were inundated with floods, forcing people to climb on their roofs for safety. Several wadis and reefs in the country also overflowed due to heavy rains.

Coastal areas were also affected by storm surges from Shaheen.   of downpour were reported in the wilayat of Al-Khaboura, the highest in association with the storm, as of October 4. The Royal Oman Police rescued two people stranded in a wadi in Suwaiq on October 4 while the Al-Khoud dam was reported to be overflowed due to heavy rains.

In total, at least 14 people died in Oman. Many towns and cities saw their average annual rainfall or more in just one day or less. Dams overflowed, and there were multiple reports of landslides across the affected regions. Roads were blocked due to flooding and other debris. Mud also collected in flooded areas. Muscat had seen flooding in several areas, along with felled trees and other structural damage. However, the city mostly returned to normal the next day.

The clean-up operation in Oman was estimated to cost more than $100 million (38 million Omani Rials). At least 1,000 homes were affected, not counting the farms and private businesses. Volunteers in the operation noted fallen street lights, broken telecom masts, dead animals, and damaged roads and bridges.

United Arab Emirates 
Only light rainfall was recorded in parts of Al Ain, Hatta, and Ajman, due to the storm. There were also some reports of slightly increased winds, with overall damage being minor.

Yemen 
The remnant of Cyclone Shaheen caused heavy rainfall in Yemen, damaging historical sites. It was reported that 20 vehicles were washed away by flash flooding.

Aftermath

Shaheen

Oman 
Sohar Port's marine operations, ports, and crude loading operations re-opened on October 4. Contingency plans that were put in place before Shaheen helped lessen impacts. The Central Bank of Oman announced on October 5 that it would allocate 7 million Omani rials (US$18.4 million) to people affected by Shaheen, also calling on all banks to help mitigate the effects of the cyclone. The bank confirmed that it would coordinate with government agencies to transfer the funds needed. His Majesty Abdullah II of Jordan expressed condolences over the victims of Shaheen the same day. Helicopters patrolled inundated areas and rescued those affected, including one prisoner from a rooftop in Suwayq. Oman's armed forces helped with several rescues.

Due to a widespread lack of home insurance in Oman, many feared that money raised from private funds would not be enough to cover repairs. At least 5,000 people were put into 80 temporary shelters. Relief workers said that the clean-up operation in Batinah region could take months.

See also 

Weather of 2021
Tropical cyclones in 2021
Cyclone GonuStrongest cyclone on record in the Arabian Sea which was the last cyclone to enter the Gulf of Oman, prior to Shaheen
Cyclone YemyinTook a similar track, made landfall in India and Pakistan respectively
Cyclone VardahA cyclone that also crossed the Indian subcontinent and regenerated in the Arabian Sea
Tropical Depression Wilma (2013)A long-lived system that cross over from the West Pacific into the Bay of Bengal and then the Arabian sea

References

External links 

 Preliminary Report of Cyclonic Storm Gulab and Severe Cyclonic Storm Shaheen IMD
 JTWC Best Track Data of Tropical Cyclone 03B (Shaheen-Gulab)
 03B.SHAHEEN-GULAB from the U.S. Naval Research Laboratory

Gulab-Shaheen
2021 disasters in India
2021 North Indian Ocean cyclone season
Cyclonic storms
Tropical cyclones in India
Tropical cyclones in Pakistan
Tropical cyclones in Iran
Tropical cyclones in Oman
Tropical cyclones in the United Arab Emirates
Tropical cyclones in Yemen
September 2021 events in India
September 2021 events in Asia
October 2021 events in India
October 2021 events in Pakistan
October 2021 events in the United Arab Emirates
October 2021 events in Iran